Luke Fagan (b Lickbla 1659 - d Dublin 1733) was  an Irish Roman Catholic bishop in the first third of the 18th century.
Fagan  Licabla, Castlepollard, Co. Westmeath, he was educated at Jesuit run Irish College of Seville and was ordained priest in 1682. His brother Fr. James Fagan was educated at the Irish College of Alcalá, Spain, and served as its superior.

He served as parish priest in Baldoyle and howth prior to being consecrated Bishop of Meath in 1713 and translated to the
Archbishopric of Dublin in 1729. He died in post on 22 November 1733.

Controversies
Fagan was involved in a number of controversies while a bishop. He was supposed to have encouraged Sylvester Lloyd OFM to translate the Jansenist leaning Francois Pouget's Montepellier catechism.  Influenced by Jansenist sympathiser Fr. Paul Kenny ODC, as Bishop of Meath Fagan, ordained twelve Dutch Jansenist priests including future Archbishop of Utrecht, Petrus Johannes Meindaerts and Jerome de Bock(Bishop of Haarlem).

Notes

1659 births
1733 deaths
People from County Westmeath
18th-century Roman Catholic archbishops in Ireland
Roman Catholic archbishops of Dublin
Roman Catholic bishops of Meath